Mashima (written: 真島) is a Japanese surname. Notable people with the surname include:

 (born 1977), Japanese manga artist
 (born 1962), Japanese musician

Fictional characters:
, character from Chihayafuru

Japanese-language surnames